Devimala, is one of the 14 highest peak of Western Ghats in the (Devikulam) taluk of Idukki district of Kerala. Devimala Peak lies in the Anamalai hills of Kerala. It is located at the tea estate of Devikulam near to Munnar. It is the highest peak in the Devikulam hill station. It stands at an altitude of 2,521 m (8731 ft). Anamudi is located near to these peak. It is the seventh highest peak in South India.

References

Mountains of Kerala
Geography of Idukki district
Mountains of the Western Ghats
Two-thousanders of Asia